Caroline Simmons (born February 10, 1986) is an American politician serving as the mayor of Stamford, Connecticut. A member of the Democratic Party, she previously served as State Representative for Connecticut's 144th District, where she was the youngest female legislator in Connecticut state office. She is married to former Republican State Senator Art Linares. Simmons won the 2021 Stamford mayoral election, becoming the city's first female mayor.

Early life and career 
Simmons was born in Greenwich, Connecticut and raised in a family of five children with a Democratic mother and Republican father. She was the president of her high school, captain of three varsity sports and a two-time All-American lacrosse player. She earned her bachelor's degree from Harvard College in 2008, where she majored in Government. While in college, Simmons played on the varsity lacrosse team and spent a semester studying abroad at the American University in Egypt.

After graduating Harvard she worked on Barack Obama's Presidential Transition Team, before accepting a job at the Department of Homeland Security. At the Department of Homeland Security, Simmons served as Director of Special Projects in the Counterterrorism Coordinator's Office and traveled to Kabul many times for her work. Simmons also earned a Master of Arts degree in Middle East Studies from the Elliott School of International Affairs at George Washington University in 2011.

Connecticut General Assembly

Elections 
In 2014, Simmons became a state representative candidate for the 144th district. Simmons defeated incumbent Republican Michael Molgano with 53.8% of the vote, and was the only Connecticut Democrat in   2014 to defeat an incumbent Republican. In 2016, Simmons won re-election, defeating her challenger with 67% of the vote. In 2018 and 2020, Simmons won re-election, while pregnant during both elections.

Tenure 
In her first term, Simmons Introduced or co-sponsored 53 bi-partisan bills, two which reduced regulations for small businesses and six of which lowered taxes on hospitals, businesses, and residents. She also secured $65 million in funding for schools, passed legislation improving public safety, gun safety, and pedestrian safety, and  co-sponsored legislation for a Connecticut Competitiveness Council. Simmons introduced and led debate on a bill to enhance the state's cyber security. During her second term, Simmons continued advocating for improvements to Stamford public schools, infrastructure, and public safety. She was appointed as Chair of the Commerce Committee, becoming one of the youngest women to ever do so. As chair, she has focused on small business development and job growth, especially given the COVID-19 pandemic.

Mayor of Stamford (2021–present)

2021 election 

On February 10, 2021, Simmons declared her run for mayor of Stamford, Connecticut in the 2021 Stamford mayoral election. Simmons was endorsed by the Stamford Democratic City Committee against two-term incumbent Mayor David Martin. Simmons was also endorsed by the Independent Party of Connecticut. Martin collected enough signatures to force a Democratic primary election which took place on September 14, 2021. Simmons defeated Martin in a landslide, winning the majority of votes in every voting district. Simmons had raised over $239,000 for her primary campaign, outpacing Martin's $78,000.

Simmons faced unaffiliated candidate Bobby Valentine in the general election. The Republican-endorsed candidate dropped out prior to the Democratic primary and endorsed Valentine. The race attracted several high-profile donors, amounting to a total of $1.2M between both candidates. Simmons garnered national attention after she announced she was expecting her third child, and again when she was endorsed by President Barack Obama. The race was characterized as "tense" with Simmons claiming Valentine had used misogynistic language and Valentine claiming Simmons was ageist.

Initial results on election night indicated a close race, but absentee ballots swung heavily in Simmons' favor resulting in a 5-point victory. Valentine originally claimed duplicate ballots may have influenced the result, but conceded soon afterward. Valentine did not contact Simmons on election night, and characterized local press coverage as "lousy", adding he could not compliment Simmons' victory "with an open heart and clear mind."

Tenure 

Prior to being sworn into office, Mayor-elect Simmons appointed State Senator Patricia Billie Miller, Cradle to Career President Bridget Fox, and Stamford Health President Kathleen Silard to serve as co-chairs for her transition team. Miller was the most senior legislator among the Stamford delegation and an ally to Simmons throughout her mayoral campaign. Fox previously served in the City of Stamford under Mayors Malloy and Pavia. Fox was later appointed as Simmons' chief of staff.

After being sworn in as Mayor, Simmons announced she would retain two cabinet members from the previous administration: Sandra Dennies as Director of Administration, and Ted Jankowski as Director of Public Safety, Health, and Welfare. Dennies and Jankowski were both incumbents in their positions who served under Mayor Martin. Dennies had previously served as Director of Administration under Mayor Malloy. Jankowski was nominated by Mayor Pavia in 2012 and reappointed by Martin for both of his terms. Six months after being reappointed, Jankowski announced he would step down from the position. Simmons nominated Assistant Police Chief Louis DeRubeis as Jankowski's replacement.

Simmons brought in new appointments for cabinet positions including Matthew Quinones as Director of Operations, Doug Dalena as Director of Legal Affairs, and Loren Nadres as Director of Economic Development. Quinones had previously served on Stamford's Board of Representatives since 2013, including as President of the Board from 2017 to 2021. Dalena left his position as Deputy General Counsel to Governor Lamont to accept the position in Stamford. Nadres had worked in New York City on economic issues for over a decade prior to accepting her role in Stamford. All of Simmons' appointments were approved by the Board of Representatives.

In her first year as Mayor, Simmons pursued policies that addressed the affordability of living in Stamford. Her administration's first-year budget recommended a 1 percent tax increase. This increase was below the city's average of 2 to 3 percent each year from 2013 to 2022. Simmons pursued capital budget increases for sidewalk construction and school buildings while obtaining state and federal funding to offset the increased cost on taxpayers. These capital investments echoed a claim made by commentators during Simmons' mayoral campaign that her connections to state and federal agencies could result in more funding for local initiatives. 

In August 2022, Simmons' administration pursued a project to renovate Stamford's Glenbrook Community Center into affordable housing but the proposal received significant pushback. Stamford's Board of Representatives Legislative and Rules Committee voted against the proposal and local residents organized in opposition to the plan. In a public meeting with organizers, Simmons claimed the proposal was the target of misinformation. She later submitted her first op-ed to the local newspaper emphasizing the claims of misinformation and characterizing counter-proposals as "not operationally viable or fiscally responsible." Despite her initial defense of the proposal, Simmons eventually withdrew the proposal before it was voted on by the board. 

Simmons' public comments about the failed affordable housing proposal received criticism from board members after the proposal was rescinded. Prior to withdrawing the proposal, Simmons attended a conference in Chicago and claimed opposition to affordable housing in Stamford included "really abhorrent language from some community members around 'Are there going to be background checks for the people living in this facility?' and just really despicable language." These comments were shared by Simmons on her own personal Instagram page. When asked to identify individuals who used this language, Simmons singled out Democratic Majority Leader Nina Sherwood and another board member of the same party. Sherwood said the mayor's claim was "a complete fabrication" and asked Simmons to "tell the truth and apologize for her hurtful Chicago statements." Simmons denied to elaborate on her claims and stated she wasn't interested in "calling people out individually." Stamford's Board of Representatives requested a meeting to privately discuss "alleged and misconstrued comments" but the outcome of this request was not publicly reported.

Personal life 
Simmons lives in Stamford with her Republican husband and three children. Outside of political office, she is involved in the community and serves on the board of the Women's Business Development Council and the Executive Committee of the Stamford Partnership.

References 

1985 births
Democratic Party members of the Connecticut House of Representatives
Living people
Women state legislators in Connecticut
Harvard University alumni
Elliott School of International Affairs alumni
Politicians from Stamford, Connecticut
21st-century American politicians
21st-century American women politicians
Mayors of Stamford, Connecticut